Igor Olegovich Meda (born 29 April 1967) is a former Russian professional footballer.

Club career
He made his professional debut in the Soviet Second League in 1988 for FC Lokomotiv Mineralnye Vody.

Full name
FC Krylia Sovetov Samara's official site lists his patronymic as Igor Vladimirovich and the Professional Football League lists him as Igor Olegovich.

See also
Football in Russia

References

1967 births
Living people
Soviet footballers
Russian footballers
Association football defenders
FC Armavir players
FC Kuban Krasnodar players
PFC Krylia Sovetov Samara players
FC Ural Yekaterinburg players
Russian Premier League players